

Gmina Nowy Targ is a rural gmina (administrative district) in Nowy Targ County, Lesser Poland Voivodeship, in southern Poland. Its seat is the town of Nowy Targ, although the town is not part of the territory of the gmina.

Villages
Gmina Nowy Targ contains the villages and settlements of Dębno, Długopole, Dursztyn, Gronków, Harklowa, Klikuszowa, Knurów, Krauszów, Krempachy, Lasek, Łopuszna, Ludźmierz, Morawczyna, Nowa Biała, Obidowa, Ostrowsko, Pyzówka, Rogoźnik, Szlembark, Trute and Waksmund.

Neighbouring gminas
Gmina Nowy Targ is bordered by the town of Nowy Targ and by the gminas of Bukowina Tatrzańska, Czarny Dunajec, Czorsztyn, Kamienica, Łapsze Niżne, Niedźwiedź, Ochotnica Dolna, Raba Wyżna, Rabka-Zdrój and Szaflary.

References
Polish official population figures 2006

Nowy Targ
Nowy Targ County